Lavilla is a surname and a feminine given name. People with the name include:

Surname

Félix Lavilla (1928–2013), Spanish pianist
Gregorio Lavilla (born 1973), Spanish motorcycle road racer
James Lavilla-Havelin, American poet
Landelino Lavilla (1934–2020), Spanish lawyer and politician

Given name
Lavilla Esther Allen (1834–1903), American author

Surnames of Spanish origin
Feminine given names